All Saints' Church is a Catholic church located in Borella, Colombo, Sri Lanka. It is administered by the Roman Catholic Archdiocese of Colombo and belongs to the Borella parish.

History 
The beginnings of the church date back to 1884, when Wyndham Thompson, wife of the Superintendent of the Convict Establishment (Welikada Prisons) and an enthusiastic Irish Catholic lady, met the Governor and reserved  from the  allocated to the Campbell park to build a church. This church was dedicated to All Saints and the foundation for the current church was laid on 24 August 1935.

Interior 
The interior of the church is very colorful with stained glass windows with the main window above the altar depicting Mother of Perpetual Help. The church also features a carillon made up of 25 bells cast in West Germany with each bell having a name of a saint. The church has a balcony for the choir.

Notable people 
 Fr. John Herath (Parish Priest, 1948-1977)

References 

Gothic Revival church buildings in Sri Lanka
Roman Catholic churches in Sri Lanka
Churches in Colombo